Cache Creek, originally Rivière de la Cache, is a tributary of the Bonaparte River in the Thompson Country of the Interior of British Columbia, Canada, joining that river at the town of Cache Creek, British Columbia, which is located at the junction of the Trans-Canada and Cariboo Highways.

Approximately 20 kilometres in length, the stream rises in the Arrowstone Hills to the northeast of the town and runs southwest to its confluence with the Bonaparte at the town of Cache Creek.

See also
Elephant Hill Provincial Park
Hat Creek (British Columbia)

References
BCGNIS listing "Cache Creek (creek)"

Thompson Country
Rivers of British Columbia